The United States Veterans' Affairs Subcommittee on Health is one of the four subcommittees within the House Veterans' Affairs Committee.
The Subcommittee on Health has legislative and oversight jurisdiction for the Department of Veterans Affairs’ health care system, programs and research apparatus.

Jurisdiction 

The Subcommittee on Health has legislative and oversight jurisdiction for the Department of Veterans Affairs' health care system, veterans programs as well as research. Over the past decade, VA has transformed the health care system to better serve veterans. VA now operates over 1400 sites of care to include medical centers, nursing homes, hundreds of community-based outpatient clinics organized into service networks located throughout the nation, now caring for an estimated 5.5 million veterans.

Recent hearings by the Subcommittee on Health have explored important matters such as the adequacy of the Veteran's Health Administration's health care budget request; veterans access to health care in rural areas of the United States; VA's Polytrauma System of Care as well as the VA's capacity to adequately treat Traumatic Brain Injury (TBI); Gulf War Exposures, Women and Minority Veterans' issues; VA's long-term care program; and the Vet Center program and services.

Members, 117th Congress

Historical membership rosters

115th Congress

116th Congress

External links 

 Subcommittee page

Veterans' Affairs Health